Daniel Truitt is an American politician and engineer, and member of the Libertarian Party. In 2010, he was elected to represent the 156th District in the Pennsylvania House of Representatives. He was defeated in his 2016 bid for re-election by West Chester Mayor Carolyn Comitta. In April 2022, Truitt became the chairman of the Chester County, Pennsylvania Libertarian Party.

References

External links
 State Representative Dan Truitt official caucus website
 Dan Truitt (R) official PA House website
 Dan Truitt for State Representative official campaign website

Republican Party members of the Pennsylvania House of Representatives
Pennsylvania Libertarians
Living people
People from West Chester, Pennsylvania
21st-century American politicians
Year of birth missing (living people)